Christophe Guedes (born 16 February 1993) is a Swiss footballer of Portuguese descent who plays for Nyon as a goalkeeper.

Football career
On 10 March 2010, Guedes made his professional debut with Nyon in a 2009–10 Swiss Challenge League match against Locarno, when he started and played the full game.

References

External links

1993 births
Footballers from Geneva
Swiss people of Portuguese descent
Living people
Swiss men's footballers
Association football goalkeepers
FC Stade Nyonnais players
Servette FC players
FC Meyrin players
Étoile Carouge FC players
FC Stade Lausanne Ouchy players
Yverdon-Sport FC players
Swiss Challenge League players
Swiss Promotion League players
Swiss 1. Liga (football) players
2. Liga Interregional players